The eighth series of Dream Team was broadcast on Sky One from October 2004 to May 2005, covering the 2004–05 English football season. It followed the story of Harchester United attempting to return to the Premier League after relegation the previous season and their first participation in the UEFA Champions League.

Cast
Several new faces were brought on board for series eight, mainly within the backroom staff of the club. The most notable of the new signings was former Boyzone singer Shane Lynch, in his first major acting role on television.

Main cast
Stephen Raman-Hughes as Carl Caskey
Timothy Smith as Clyde Connelly
Chucky Venice as Curtis Alexander
Danny Husbands as Danny Sullivan
Michael Ryan as Dean Boyle
Jon Morrison as Don Barker
Shane Lynch as Eli Knox
Colin Parry as Frank Stone
Kara Tointon as Gina Moliano
Lucinda Rhodes-Flaherty as Jodie Stone
Terry Kiely as Karl Fletcher
James Watts as Lee Presley
Ricky Whittle as Ryan Naysmith
Lisa McAllister as Sofia Moxham
Chris Brazier as Tommy Valentine
Philip Brodie as Vivian "Jaws" Wright

Supporting cast
Andy Ansah as himself
Karen Ferrari as Chelsea Wright
Darren White as Darren Tyson
Lamorna Watts as Holly Jones
Ray MacAllan as Jeff Stein
Rebecca Loos as Naomi Wyatt
Ike Hamilton as Nathan Woods
Cassandra Bell as Nicole Caskey
Nina Muschallik as Nikki Peggs
Hannah Tointon as Savannah Caskey

In addition there were cameo appearances throughout the series by Jeff Stelling and George Gavin as themselves. Kevin Keatings remained as match commentator for the third consecutive series.

Episodes

Dream Team (TV series)